Jaroslav Vlček (3 September 1900 – 25 January 1970) was a Czechoslovak footballer. He competed in the men's tournament at the 1924 Summer Olympics. On a club level, he played for Čechie Karlín.

References

External links
 

1900 births
1970 deaths
Czech footballers
Czechoslovak footballers
Czechoslovakia international footballers
Olympic footballers of Czechoslovakia
Footballers at the 1924 Summer Olympics
Place of birth missing
Association football forwards